Innominatum may refer to:

 Dysschema innominatum, a moth of the family Erebidae
 Hip bone, also known as os innominatum in Latin